Tunstall v Steigmann [1962] 2 QB 593 is a British company law case concerning, inter alia, the separate legal personality of an incorporated company.

Facts
Mrs Tunstall was the tenant of a shop owned by Mrs Steigmann, with the shop being held by Mrs Tunstall on lease for three years from 19 April 1958. Mrs Steigmann also owned an adjacent shop where she carried on a pork butchery business. On 12 April 1961, Mrs Steigmann served a notice on Mrs Tunstall under Part II of the Landlord and Tenant Act 1954; the notice stated that Mrs Steigmann would oppose an application by Mrs Tunstall for a new tenancy on the ground that she intended to occupy the holding leased out to Mrs Tunstall for the purpose of carrying on her butchery business therein and that the existing tenancy was to be terminated on 19 October 1961. On 11 August 1961, Mrs Tunstall applied to the York County Court for a grant of a new lease of five year's duration pursuant to Part II of the Landlord and Tenant Act. Section 30(1)(g) of the Landlord and Tenant Act prevented landlords who wished to terminate tenancies from opposing a tenant's application for a new tenancy unless there were exceptional circumstances, with these including the landlord wishing to occupy the premises themselves to carry on a new business; accordingly, Mrs Steigmann filed a notice of her intention to oppose the grant of a new tenancy on those grounds.

The case was heard on 26 September 1961. In the meantime, Mrs Steigmann promoted a limited company for the purpose of carrying on her butchery business. Mrs Tunstall claimed that the business was now being carried on by the company rather than Mrs Steigmann herself and, because the company was a separate legal person, Mrs Steigmann did not have the right to repossession under the statute.

Judgement

County Court
At the hearing of a preliminary point as to whether Mrs Steigmann intended to occupy the premises within the meaning of section 30(1)(g), it was agreed that the business was to be carried on by the company formed by Mrs Steigmann, that she held all the shares in the company with the exception of two which were in the possession of her nominees, and that she had the sole control of the company and its business. McKee J ruled that it was Mrs Steigmann's intention to carry on the business notwithstanding that it was now owned by the limited company and dismissed Mrs Tunstall's application for a new tenancy, saying that:

Court of Appeal
Mrs Tunstall subsequently appealed to the Court of Appeal, with judgements read on 23 March 1962. Ormerod LJ began by analysing Evershed MR's statement in Pegler v Craven that "in some circumstances it could be said that a company in actual occupation was but the alter ego of the tenant" and that while such a conclusion might be arrived at in some cases, it could not be arrived at in Pegler for the company could not be said to be a mere alter ego of the applicant in that case:

He then turned to Mrs Steigmann's reliance on section 30(1)(g) of the Landlord and Tenant Act, noting that the only question to be considered was whether she intended to occupy the shop for the purposes of carrying on a business therein:

In the course of the case, Ormerod LJ had asked if there was "anything to merit a departure from the main principle of Salomon v. Salomon & Co. Ltd.", with the judges subsequently being referred to cases such as Daimler Co. Ltd. v. Continental Tyre & Rubber (Great Britain) Ltd.:

Wilmer LJ and Danckwerts LJ concurred.

See also

UK company law

Notes

References

United Kingdom company case law
Court of Appeal (England and Wales) cases
1962 in British law
1962 in case law